Parthena Sarafidis is an Austrian former competitive figure skater. She is the 1983 World Junior bronze medalist and the 1984 Austrian national champion. She placed 11th at the 1984 European Championships in Budapest and 16th at the 1984 World Championships in Ottawa.

Competitive highlights

References 

Austrian female single skaters
Living people
World Junior Figure Skating Championships medalists
Year of birth missing (living people)